The Inter-Continental (also known as the Inter-Con) is a five star hotel located in the Karte Parwan neighbourhood in western Kabul, Afghanistan. It served as the nation's first international luxury hotel, one of the most visited by foreigners since its opening in 1969, built nearby the Bagh-e Bala Palace. The hotel has 200 rooms and is equipped with a swimming pool, a gym, and about four restaurants for dine in or room service.

History

Construction started on the hotel in April 1967 and was opened for business on 9 September 1969. While originally developed by the InterContinental Hotels Group and built by Taylor Woodrow construction from the United Kingdom, the Inter-Continental Hotel has had no association with InterContinental Hotels Group since 1980 following the Soviet intervention in Afghanistan. Despite this it continues to use the name and logo without connection to the parent company.

During the 1990s civil war it began receiving damage due to street warfare by militia men. In 1996, only 85 of the hotel's 200 rooms were habitable due to damage from rockets and shells.  It was extensively used by Western journalists during the U.S. invasion of Afghanistan in 2001 as it was the only large-sized hotel still operating in the capital at the time.

In 2003 the hotel pool had no water and the gym was missing all of its furniture. The hotel had several power cuts per day. There were still bullet holes throughout the building, including the windows of the restaurant on the first floor. The furniture in the rooms was simple but clean. In February 2003, a British intelligence agent named Colin Berry, who had been involved in the recovery of surface-to-air missiles and other covert operations, was involved in a gun battle in the hotel. As a result, two Afghans were killed.

The hotel went through a $25 million renovation by a Dubai based company. It is the landmark used at the start of the Hash House Harriers weekly events. , the rooms are decorated according to international standard, equipped with air conditioner, heater, TV, mini-bar, phone and radio. English, German and French TV channels are also available. It has an internet cafe located in the basement. The telephone system is still operated by its original old manual switchboard, which was manufactured by Siemens.

From 2005 to 2007, the top floor Presidential suite has been converted and used as office space by the Senlis Council, a European advocacy group, since then rebranded as The International Council on Security and Development (ICOS). All Senlis Council expat staff were based in the hotel.

2011 attack 

On 28 June 2011, an attack by armed suicide bombers, and an ensuing five-hour siege, left at least 21 people dead, including all nine attackers. Responsibility was claimed by the Taliban.

2018 attack 

On 20 January 2018, a group of four or five gunmen attacked the hotel, sparking a 12-hour battle. The attack left at least 42 people dead and more than 14 others injured.

References

External links 

 Intercontinental Hotel: Official Site

Hotels in Kabul
InterContinental hotels
Hotel Inter-Continental Kabul
Hotel Inter-Continental Kabul
Hotels established in 1969
Hotel Inter-Continental Kabul